Teixeirinha (March 3, 1927 - December 4, 1985), given name Vitor Mateus Teixeira, was a Brazilian musician.  Teixeirinha is the diminutive form of the common Brazilian surname of Teixeira, is one of the greatest Brazilian artists, Teixeirinha was the first artist in the world to sell 1 million copies of a disc of only one recorded song, called "O Rei do Disco" by this record sales, currently has sold 130 million copies.

The song to sell 1 million copies was "Coração de Luto", was re-recorded by several Brazilian artists, including the duo Milionário and José Rico, and the singer Sérgio Reis, as well as a re-recording made by a Spanish singer named Chacho Santa Cruz.

Teixeirinha is also the artist who composed the most songs in Brazil, he composed exactly 1,200 songs, recorded 758 in more than 50 albums, being one of the few artists to be successful outside America, arriving in Europe and Africa, an album by Teixeirinha was currently discovered released in Russia and England.

Biography
Vitor Mateus Teixeira (Teixeirinha) was born in the city of Rolante, district of Mascaradas, Rio Grande do Sul, Brazil on March 3, 1927. Son of Saturno Teixeira and Ledurina Mateus Teixeira, he had a brother and two sisters.
At the age of seven he lost his father and at the age of nine his mother, becoming an orphan, he went to live with relatives, but they were unable to take care of him, to survive, he went around town and worked on everything, from carrying bags, sell fruit and sweets, even a newspaper delivery.

At the age of sixteen, he self-registered as a Brazilian citizen, and began to have documents. At the age of eighteen, he joined the Army, but did not get to serve and, on this occasion, he went to work at the DAER (Department of Highways), as a machine operator for six years. From there he left to pursue an artistic career singing on radio stations in cities in the interior, such as Lajeado, Estrela, Rio Pardo, Santa Cruz do Sul and, in the latter, he met his wife Zoraida Lima Teixeira, whom he married in 1957. At night Teixeirinha performed on the Passo Fundo Municipal Radio, singing and making his improvised verses. Vitor and Zoraida never separated and from this union were born the daughters Nancy Margareth, Gessi Elizabeth, Fátima Lisete and Márcia Bernadeth, with whom the artist shared his entire personal and artistic life.

In 1959, he was invited to São Paulo to record his first album, a 78Rpm with the songs: “Xote Soledade” and “Briga no Batizado”. According to the testimony of Dr. Biaggio Baccarin, the artistic director of the time and also a lawyer for the Chantecler Recording Company, the beginning of Teixeirinha's success is unforgettable. In the same year, Teixeirinha recorded the song "Coração de Luto", a song he tells about the death of his mother, the song was recorded at a 78Rpm, in 1960 the album of the song "Coração de Luto" sold exactly 1 million copies, an unprecedented event in the history of music, so far, no artist in the world had sold 1 million copies of a 78Rpm record, Coração de Luto was the first song in history to sell 1 million copies, the records were sold so quickly that it resembles Beatlemania, only without the tumult of screaming fans.

The song “Coração de Luto” which currently has sold more than 25 million copies, is the only one in the world, best selling, surpassing singers such as Michael Jackson, Julio Iglesias, contemporary singers of great sales of records, but not a single song, such as the case of “Coração de Luto”, which continues in the quotation of one of the most played songs.

With the unexpected success, Teixeirinha returned to Passo Fundo and sold his Tiro ao Alvo stand, and moved to Porto Alegre. He was called again by Chantecler, this time to live in the capital of São Paulo and continue the dissemination of the success of “Coração de Luto”, however, he refused to live in São Paulo, returning to the capital of Rio Grande do Sul.

Teixeirinha began traveling all over Brazil and became known as the “Gaúcho Coração do Rio Grande”, but soon began to be called “O Rei do Disco”, as his first albums sold 1 million copies. In 1963, he won the “Chico Viola” trophy, awarded by TV Record of São Paulo "Astros do Disco", a gala program on Brazilian television, which aimed to reward the best of each year's album, Teixeirinha won for being the best-selling singer for two consecutive years, in 1962/1963. Internationally he won the “Elefante de Ouro” trophy with the highest record sales in Portugal.

For twenty years, he presented daily radio programs with two editions: “Teixeirinha Amanhece Cantando” (in the morning) and “Teixeirinha Comanda o Espetáculo” (at night) and, on Sunday mornings, he had the program “Teixeirinha Sings for Brazil ”, with transmission from the state capital to the interior and other Brazilian states.

Teixeirinha received 13 gold discs and 5 diamond discs. He was an emeritus citizen of several municipalities in the state of Rio Grande do Sul, such as Passo Fundo, Santo Antônio da Patrulha, Rolante, and so on.
In 1973 he played 15 shows in the United States and in 1975 he played 18 shows in Canada, in addition to several performances in shows in Portugal, France, Spain and England and performed in most countries in South America.

During his twenty-two-year career, Teixeirinha was accompanied by the accordionist Mary Terezinha in concerts, on the radio and in the movies.

He recorded more than 50 unreleased albums, totaling more than 70 albums including covers, recorded exactly 758 songs of his own authorship, leaving a collection of more than 1,200 compositions, including some unpublished.

In 1985 Teixeirinha discovered he had lymphoma, after a few months, he had progressed in his recovery but on December 4, 1985, during the afternoon, Teixeirinha had a heart attack at home, the children called an ambulance but when he arrived at the hospital, Teixeirinha had died. Teixeirinha was buried in the Santa Casa da Miserocórdia cemetery in Porto Alegre, at his funeral, thousands of fans went to say goodbye, the police had to close streets because the number of people and huge, at his funeral, as he asked, were touched some songs to the sound of Accordion and Violão, as it was the style of music he most loved. Teixeirinha left 7 daughters, Márcia Teixeira, Nancy Teixeira, Margareth Teixeira, Beta Teixeira, Líria Teixeira, Liane Teixeira and Preta Teixeira, and left 2 children, Vitor Mateus Teixeira Filho and Alexandre Teixeira.

Bibliography
1968 - Heart of Mourning - Comics
1996 - Teixeirinha and Cinema (By Mirian de Souza Rossini)
2007 - Teixeirinha, the Gaucho Heart of Rio Grande (By Israel Lopes)
2018 - Teixeirinha Heart of Brazil (By Daniel Felix)
2019 - Teixeiirnha, the Gaucho Heart of Rio Grande, Volume 2 (By Israel Lopes)

Discography

Studio albums
With a 26-year career, Teixeirinha over 50 studio albums
1960 - O Gaúcho Coração do Rio Grande (Warner Music Group)
1961 - Assim é nos pampas (Warner Music Group)
1961 - Um gaúcho canta para o Brasil (Warner Music Group)
1962 - O Gaúcho Coração do Rio Grande, volume 4 (Warner Music Group)
1963 - Saudades de Passo Fundo (Warner Music Group)
1963 - Teixeirinha interpreta Músicas de Amigos (Warner Music Group)
1963 - Êta gaúcho bom (Warner Music Group)
1964 - Teixeirinha Show (Warner Music Group)
1964 - Gaúcho de Bagé (Warner Music Group)
1964 - Gaúcho autêntico (Warner Music Group)
1964 - Canarinho cantador (Warner Music Group)
1965 - O Rei do Disco (Warner Music Group)
1965 - Bate-bate coração (Warner Music Group)
1965 - Disco de ouro (Warner Music Group)
1966 - Desafio P'ra Valer (Warner Music Group
1966 - Teixeirinha no cinema (Warner Music Group)
1967 - Coração de Luto - soundtrack from the film (Warner Music Group)
1967 - Mocinho aventureiro (Universal Music Group)
1968 - Dorme Angelita (Universal Music Group)
1968 - Doce coração de mãe (Universal Music Group)
1968 - Última tropeada (Universal Music Group)
1969 - O Rei (Universal Music Group)
1969 - Volume de prata (Universal Music Group)
1970 - Carícias de amor (Universal Music Group)
1970 - Doce Amor (Universal Music Group)
1971 - Num Fora de série (Universal Music Group)
1971 - Entre a cruz e o amor (Universal Music Group)
1971 - Chimarrão da hospitalidade (Universal Music Group)
1972 - Ela tornou-se freira - soundtrack from the film (Universal Music Group)
1972 - Minha homenagem (Universal Music Group)
1972 - Último Adeus (Universal Music Group)
1973 - O Internacional (Universal Music Group)
1973 - Teixeirinha Sempre Teixeirinha (Universal Music Group)
1974 - Última Gineteada (Universal Music Group)
1975 - Trilha Sonoda do Filme Pobre João e outros Sucessos (Universal Music Group)
1975 - Aliança de ouro (Universal Music Group)
1975 - Lindo Rancho (Universal Music Group)
1976 - Coração de Luto (Universal Music Group)
1977 - Novo Som de Teixeirinha (Universal Music Group)
1977 - Norte a Sul (Universal Music Group)
1977 - Canta meu povo (Universal Music Group)
1978 - Amor de verdade (Warner Music Group)
1978 - O Vigilante (Warner Music Group)
1978 - Menina da gaita (Warner Music Group)
1979 - 20 anos de glória (Warner Music Group)
1980 - Menina Margareth (Warner Music Group)
1981 - Rio Grande de Outrora (Warner Music Group)
1981 - Iemanjá - soundtrack from the film (Warner Music Group)
1982 - Que droga de vida (Warner Music Group)
1982 - Dez desafios inéditos - Teixeirinha and Mary Terezinha (Warner Music Group)
1983 - Chegando de longe (Warner Music Group)
1984 - Guerra dos Desafios - Teixeirinha e Nalva Aguiar (Warner Music Group)
1984 - Quem é você agora (Warner Music Group)
1985 - Amor aos passarinhos (Warner Music Group)
2020 - Inéditas (NIKITA Music)

Compilation albums
1965 - Sucessos de Teixeirinha na Venezuela (Warner Music Group)
1965 - Rancheiras (Warner Music Group)
1967 - Os Grandes Sucessos de Teixeirinha (Warner Music Group)
1973 - Os Grandes Sucessos de Teixeirinha (Warner Music Group)
1974 - Los Grandes Exitos de Teixeirinha
1975 - Teixeirinha no Xote
1976 - Teixeirinha no Xote, Volume 2 (Universal Music Group)
1976 - Black or White
1979 - Milonga da Fronteira (Warner Music Group)
1985 - O Rei dos Pampas (Universal Music Group)
1985 - Recado do Céu (Warner Music Group)
1992 - Amor de Mãe (Warner Music Group)
1992 - Popularidade (Warner Music Group)
1998 - Raízes dos Pampas, Volume 1 (Universal Music Group)
1999 - Raízes dos Pampas, Volume 2 (Universal Music Group)

Special Albums
1994 - Teixeirinha Canta Com Amigos
2007 - Especial Teixeirinha
2010 - Sucessos de Teixeirinha, Teixeirinha Filho e Neto

Filmography
In 1964, Teixeirinha wrote the story of the film “Coração de Luto ”, which was produced by Leopoldis Som, in 1966, another box office record. In 1969, he staged in the film "Motorista sem Limites" together with Valter D'Avila, produced by Itacir Rossi.
In 1970 he created his own production company Teixeirinha Produções Artísticas Ltda, for which he wrote, produced and distributed ten films.
1967 - Coração de Luto
1969 - Motorista sem limites
1972 - Ela Tornou-se Freira
1973 - Teixeirinha a 7 Provas
1974 - O Pobre João
1975 - Carmen a Cigana
1976 - A Quadrilha do Perna Dura
1977 - Na Trilha da Justiça
1978 - Meu Pobre Coração de Luto
1978 - Gaúcho de Passo Fundo
1980 - Tropeiro Velho
1981 - A Filha de Iemanjá

Awards

1960 - Gold Record - Coração de Luto (Single)
1960 - Gold Record - O Gaúcho Coração do Rio Grande (Album)
1960 - Taça das músicas "Coração de Luto" and "Amor de Mãe"
1962 - Chico Viola - TV Record
1963 - Elefante de Ouro - Portugal
1963 - Rádio ABC - Música "Volte Papai"
1965 - Gold Record - O Rei do Disco (Album)
1965 - Gold Record - Disco de Ouro (Album)
1967 - Gold Record - Mocinho Aventureiro (ALbum)
1968 - Gold Record - Dorme Angelita (Album)
1970 - Gold Record - Carícias de Amor (Album)
1973 - Gold Record - O Internacional (Album)
1975 - Gold Record - Aliança de Ouro (album)
1977 - Gold Record - Canta Meu Povo (Album)
1978 - Military Brigade Cup for the song: "O Vigilante"
1978 - Gold Record - Menina da Gaita (Album)
1980 - Gold Record - Menina Margareth (Album)
1985 - Gold Record - Quem é Você Agora (Album)
2019 - Prêmio Culturas Populares

Teixeirinha Foundation
The Vitor Mateus Teixeira Foundation (Teixeirinha) is the realization of the ideal of some members of the singer's family, as a gesture of gratitude to the loving husband and father he was and, of equal importance and recognition to this artist's fans, so that they could keep the contact with his idol, through his work and his achievements stamped on his trophies, records, photographic records and much more. Thanks to the artist's own zeal, his collection was easily assembled, as he carefully kept his manuscripts, as an example; the original of “Coração de Luto”, from 1959, to the compositions of his last work recorded, in July 1985, “Amor aos Passarinhos”, released in the last month of his life, December 1985.

Companies
Editora Internacional Teixeirinha Ltda.
Teixeirinha Produções Artísticas Ltda.
Executive director: Márcia Bernadeth Lima Teixeira dos Santos

Monuments 

In 1986, a statue of Cantpor was built in his tomb, as he requested, "Mark the place that the singer of Rio Grande rests", as a way to meet the singer's request, the statue was built according to the height of the singer. In 1995 a statue of the singer was built in the city of Passo Fundo, a city that Teixeirinha adopted as his own, the statue is in front of his former residence, today is Shopping Bela Cita, the statue is in a square that bears the singer's name , in 2001, a statue was built in the central square of the city of Rolante, the singer's birthplace, currently the city of Porto Alegre has a project to build a statue of the canor in the historic center of the city.

Today they are monuments very appreciated by fans, every year, thousands of fans visit the monuments and register them in photos and videos.

The cities of Passo Fundo and Rolante, are well known for the singer's statues, being his postcard.

See also
Brazilian Gaucho Music
José Portella Delavy

References

External links
Official Site of Teixeirinha in Portuguese

1927 births
1985 deaths
People from Rolante
Brazilian male singer-songwriters
20th-century Brazilian male singers
20th-century Brazilian singers
Deaths from cancer in Rio Grande do Sul
Deaths from lymphoma